During the Cold War, Romanian dictator Nicolae Ceaușescu presided over the most pervasive cult of personality within the Eastern Bloc. Inspired by the personality cult surrounding Kim Il-sung in North Korea, it started with the 1971 July Theses which reversed the liberalization of the 1960s, imposed a strict nationalist ideology, established Stalinist totalitarianism and a return to socialist realism. Initially, the cult of personality was just focused on Ceaușescu himself. By the early 1980s, however, his wife, Elena Ceaușescu—one of the few spouses of a Communist leader to become a power in her own right—was also a focus of the cult.

Origin

Early seeds of the cult of personality can be found in the acclamation of Ceaușescu following his speech in which he denounced the Warsaw Pact invasion of Czechoslovakia in 1968. From that date, there was an increasing identification of Romania with Ceaușescu in both the Romanian media and in the statements of other officials. The real beginning of the cult of personality, however, came after Ceaușescu visited China and North Korea in 1971. He was particularly impressed by the highly personal way that China's Mao Zedong and North Korea's Kim Il-sung ruled their countries, as well as the personality cults surrounding them.

Ceaușescu's predecessor, Gheorghe Gheorghiu-Dej, had been the subject of a personality cult. However, the cult surrounding Ceaușescu went well beyond anything surrounding Gheorghiu-Dej, with one observer describing it as a "sultanistic regime."

Characteristics
Ceaușescu served as General Secretary of the Romanian Communist Party, the most powerful position in the communist state since 1965. He also became president of the State Council in 1967, making him de jure as well as de facto head of state. In 1974, he had the post upgraded to a full-fledged executive post, the President of the Republic. At that time, he was given a king-like "Presidential sceptre". Salvador Dalí congratulated him for his new sceptre in a telegram published by the state-controlled press in Romania, which failed to notice its sarcasm: 

Additionally, Ceaușescu was chairman of the Supreme Council for Economic and Social Development, president of the National Council of Working People, and chairman of the Socialist Democracy and Unity Front.

From early years, schoolchildren learned poems and songs in which the "party, the leader and the nation" are praised.

The purpose of the cult was to make any public opposition to Ceaușescu impossible, because he was considered by definition to be infallible and above any criticism.

Media portrayals
Ceaușescu began to be portrayed by the Romanian media as a communist theoretician of genius who made significant contributions to Marxism-Leninism and a political leader whose "thought" was the source of all national accomplishments. His collected works have been republished at regular intervals and translated into several languages. The works eventually numbered dozens of volumes and were omnipresent in Romanian bookstores. Elena was portrayed as the "Mother of the Nation." By all accounts, her vanity and her desire for honours exceeded that of her husband.

The media used the expression "golden era of Ceaușescu" and a plethora of formulaic appellations such as "guarantor of the nation's progress and independence" and "visionary architect of the nation's future". Dan Ionescu, a writer for Radio Free Europe compiled a list of epithets for Ceaușescu that were used by Romanian writers. They included "architect", "celestial body" (Mihai Beniuc), "demiurge", "secular god" (Corneliu Vadim Tudor), "fir tree", "Prince Charming" (Ion Manole), "genius", "saint" (Eugen Barbu), "miracle", "morning star" (Vasile Andronache), "navigator" (Victor Nistea), "saviour" (Niculae Stoian), "sun" (Alexandru Andrițoiu), "titan" (Ion Potopin) and "visionary" (Viorel Cozma). He was most commonly described as the Conducător, or "the leader."

However, he was also described as being a man of humble origins, who had risen to the top through his own efforts, and was thus linked symbolically to common folk heroes in Romanian history, such as Horea and Avram Iancu.

Not surprisingly, the Ceaușescus were greatly concerned about their public image. Most photos of them showed them in their late 40s. Romanian state television was under strict orders to portray them in the best possible light. Elena was never seen in profile because of her large nose and overall homely appearance. Consequences for breaking these rules were severe; one producer showed footage of Ceaușescu blinking and stuttering, and was banned for three months.

At one time, the ubiquitous photographs of Ceaușescu were all representing one photo in which he was shown in half-profile, with just one ear showing. After a joke spread about this being the portrait "in one ear" (a Romanian idiom meaning "to be crazy"), the photographs from profile were considered improper and the portraits were replaced with new photographs in which both ears were clearly visible.

Arts and literature
Intellectuals were called upon to voice their appreciation of Ceaușescu. In 1973, a large tome called Omagiu ("Homage") was published in his praise. By the 1980s, annual volumes of praise by Romanian intellectuals were published, containing prose, poetry and songs. These volumes were published on Nicolae's birthday, which was a national holiday.

Artists such as painter Sabin Bălașa depicted Ceaușescu in works of art commissioned by the state.

Dissent

Within civil society

According to dissident Mihai Botez, the main reason why few people were willing to openly express dissent was not just an issue of courage, but also a cost–benefit analysis: many people realized that speaking out would do nothing to hurt the well-organized regime, because they would suffer the consequences for doing so, such as being expelled from the university, sent into exile or forced to leave the country.

The problem was also augmented by the fact that until the late 1980s, Western countries had good relations with Ceauşescu and they did not care about Romania's internal problems. The admiration for Romania's independent policies expressed by the United States, United Kingdom, France and Japan discouraged the opposition. Mihai Botez said he felt that for years, dissidents like him were perceived as "enemies of the West" because they were trying to distance Ceaușescu from the United States.

The Western countries' support for Ceaușescu ended with the rise of Mikhail Gorbachev in March 1985, when Ceaușescu ceased to be relevant on the world scene and Western countries criticised him for his unwillingness to implement his own version of perestroika and glasnost.

Within the Communist Party
There was little dissent within the Romanian Communist Party. One major incident was in November 1979, during the Twelfth Congress of the Communist Party, when an elderly high-ranking official, Constantin Pîrvulescu, accused the Congress of doing little to address the problems then existing inside the country, because it was instead preoccupied with perpetuating Ceaușescu's glorification. Following this, he was expelled from the Congress and put under strict surveillance and house arrest.

Legacy
By the late 1980s, the Communist Party—and indeed, nearly all other institutions in Romania—had become completely subordinated to Ceaușescu's will. Although Ceaușescu was a national Communist, his absolute control over the country and the pervasiveness of the cult led several non-Romanian observers to describe his regime as one of the closest things to an old-style Stalinist regime. Partly due to the PCR's subordination to Ceaușescu, it disappeared in the immediate aftermath of the Romanian Revolution and has never been revived.

Due to the cult of personality and along with it the concentration of power in the hands of the Ceaușescu family, much of the Romanian people's frustration was directed personally against Nicolae Ceaușescu, rather than against the political apparatus of the Communist Party as a whole. This is perhaps why the winner of the 1990 general election was the National Salvation Front, made up largely of former Communist Party members.

See also

Kim dynasty (North Korea)
List of cults of personality
Mao Zedong's cult of personality
North Korean cult of personality
Stalin's cult of personality
Xi Jinping's cult of personality

Notes

References
 Dennis Deletant. Ceauşescu and the Securitate: Coercion and Dissent in Romania, 1965-1989, p. 229. M.E. Sharpe, 1995, .
 Steven D. Roper, Romania: The Unfinished Revolution, Routledge, 2000, 
 William E. Crowther, The Political Economy of Romanian Socialism. New York: Praeger, 1988, 

Ceausescu's cult of personality
Ceausescu
Cult of personality